Phulhar is an ancient historical site in Madhubani district of Mithila region of Bihar, India. It is the place where Lord Rama and Goddess Sita first time met. It was a flower garden of King Janaka of Mithila. A very famous temple of Goddess Bhagwati known as Girija Sthan is situated here. This place is mentioned in many Hindu texts of the ancient India. This place has been recognised by the Government of Bihar in 2020 as tourist centre for Hindu pilgrims. This place is related to Lord Rama.

Description 
According to Shree Ramcharitmanas, mother Sunayana sent princess Sita to this place for worshiping Goddess Girija. There Lord Rama and Lakshmana also came to pick up some flowers for their teacher Vishwamitra to worshiping. In the garden Lord Rama and Sita saw each other for the first time in their life. There is a very famous pond known as Bagh Tarag, which is mentioned at Doha number 227 in Bal Kand of Ramayana composed by Tulsidas.

References 

Places in the Ramayana
Tourist attractions in Bihar
Mithila
Ramayana
Madhubani district